The 2019 LFA Super Taça is the 4th staging of the LFA Super Taça. A cup played in a single game between the two best teams in the country.

Participants are classified through two main competitions: Liga Futebol Amadora Primeira Divisão and Taça 12 de Novembro.

The match of this edition of ST was played on October 18, 2019 at the Estádio Café Ermera in the city of Ermera, in East Timor.

Teams

The cup was disputed by two teams: one classified through the 2019 Liga Futebol Amadora Primeira Divisão and the other through the 2019 Taça 12 de Novembro.

The Lalenok United team was champion of the two qualifying competitions, so the SLB Laulara team, which was runner-up in the Taça 12 de Novembro, was given the right to compete in the Super Taça.

Final

References

Taça 12 de Novembro
Liga Futebol Amadora
Timor-Leste